Victor Trumper Jr (7 October 1913 – 31 August 1981) was an Australian cricketer. He was the son of Australian Test cricketer Victor Trumper.

Biography
Trumper was born in 1913 to Victor and Sarah Trumper and was one year old when his father died of Bright's disease.

In contrast to his father, Trumper played as a fast bowler. He was played six times for New South Wales during the 1940–1941 Sheffield Shield season and made an appearance in another first-class match for a Don Bradman XI. After taking two wickets in his first over on debut, he went on to score a total of 74 runs, with a highest score of 18, and take 12 wickets before World War II caused Australian domestic cricket to be suspended at the end of the season. Trumper was described as a "useful" bowler who could make the ball move both ways and got bounce from a high bowling action.

With the outbreak of World War II, Trumper joined the Royal Australian Air Force in 1941. He played cricket during the war for an Australian Services side as well as for Carlton Cricket Club in Victorian Premier Cricket. He was discharged in 1945. He died in 1981 aged 67.

References

1913 births
1981 deaths
New South Wales cricketers
Australian cricketers
Royal Australian Air Force personnel of World War II